Brunswick Township is a township in Chariton County, in the U.S. state of Missouri.

Brunswick Township was established in 1840, taking its name from Brunswick, Missouri.

References

Townships in Missouri
Townships in Chariton County, Missouri